Nofence is a Norwegian company that makes GPS collars for farm animals (cattle, sheep, and goats) that discourage them from crossing virtual fences.

Oscar Hovde Berntsen has been working on the idea of virtual fencing, as an alternative to fixed electric fencing, since the 1990s.  Nofence was incorporated in 2011. In 2016, there was a pilot project in Norway with 850 goats. In 2017, the Norwegian Food Safety Authority approved the use of Nofence for goats; and for cattle and sheep in 2020. Nofence are based in Batnfjordsøra, Norway, with a UK office in Warwick.

The solar-powered collars play a melody "ringtone" when the animal reaches the fence, and if they continue, a small shock, as with an electric fence. Farmers can use a mobile app to change boundaries throughout the day, and avoid over-grazing. Fenceless grazing is being supported by conservationists and farmers, particularly in sensitive areas or difficult upland areas where physical fencing would be impractical, expensive or inappropriate.

In September 2020, The Times reported that trials were being conducted at six sites in the UK, including Epping Forest, in Essex.

In December 2020, Nofence stated that 17,000 collars were in use in Norway.

References

External links
Official website

Fences
Perimeter security
Norwegian companies established in 2011
Manufacturing companies established in 2011